Fone could be:
 A misspelling of phone, short for telephone 
 The name of Fone Bone, a character in the Bone comics series 
Steve Fone (born 1987), English ice-hockey player

See also
Fones (disambiguation)